Wounded may refer to:

Film and TV
 Wounded (1977 film), Canadian film
 Wounded (2007 film), Bollywood film
 Wounded (2013 film), Spanish film
 Wounded (play), 2005 stage play collaboratively developed by The Los Angeles Theatre Ensemble
 "The Wounded" (Star Trek: The Next Generation), 1991 episode of Star Trek: The Next Generation

Music

Albums
 Wounded (Enchant album), 1996 album by Enchant
 Wounded (Landmine Marathon album), 2006 album by Landmine Marathon

Songs
 "Wounded" (song), 1999 song by Third Eye Blind
 "Wounded", a song by Nik Kershaw from his album To Be Frank

See also
 Wound (disambiguation)
 Wounded Knee (disambiguation)